The London, Midland and Scottish Railway Compound 4-4-0 was a class of steam locomotive designed for passenger work.

Overview 

One hundred and ninety five engines were built by the LMS, adding to the 45 Midland Railway 1000 Class, to which they were almost identical.
They were given the power classification 4P.

The LMS continued the Midland numbering from 1045 to 1199 and then started in the lower block of 900–939. After nationalisation in 1948, BR added 40000 to their numbers so they became 40900–40939 and 41045–41199.

Accidents and incidents
Four people were killed.
On 13 March 1935, locomotive No. 1165 was hauling a milk train that was in a rear-end collision with an express freight train at King's Langley, Hertfordshire due to a signalman's error. Two other freight trains collided with the wreckage, one person was killed.

Withdrawal
The class were withdrawn between 1952 and 1961. None have survived into preservation, though the first of the Midland 1000 Class engines has. There is an unconfirmed report that No. 41168 was the subject of an unsuccessful preservation attempt by Dr. Peter Beet.

References 

Sources
 Ian Allan ABC of British Railways Locomotives, 1948 Edition, part 3, pp 5–6
 David Hunt, John Jennison and Bob Essery. LMS Locomotive Profiles No. 13: The Standard Compounds

External links 

 Class 4P-A Details at Rail UK

4P compound
4-4-0 locomotives
NBL locomotives
Vulcan Foundry locomotives
Compound locomotives
Railway locomotives introduced in 1924
Scrapped locomotives
Standard gauge steam locomotives of Great Britain
2′B h3v locomotives
Passenger locomotives